Bangalore Choir is an American hard rock band formed in 1991.  They were formed by the former frontman of Accept, David Reece, and guitarists Curt Mitchell and John Kirk (both formerly of Razor Maid).  Joining them from Hericane Alice, was bassist Ian Mayo and former Bad Boy drummer Jackie Ramos future members of the band Bad Moon Rising with Whitesnake/Dio guitarist Doug Aldrich and Lion/Tytan vocalist Kal Swann.  Their debut album, On Target, was produced by Max Norman, and featured songs co written by Jon Bon Jovi and Aldo Nova.  Despite having big names involved, the album was not a success and the band split up.

Mayo and Ramos moved on to the band Bad Moon Rising.  Mayo also continued with the band Burning Rain.  Reece formed the band Sircle of Silence before moving on to a solo career and singing with various bands like Gypsy Rose and Wicked Sensation. Curt Mitchell now is a guitar teacher in Nevada and has his own guitar site.

In 2010, talks of a reunion resurfaced with Reece being the driving force. John Kirk, Ian Mayo, and Jackie Ramos declined offers to join the band again, but Curt Mitchell accepted, as well as original bassist Danny Greenberg. These three original members, along with new guitarist Andy Susemihl (formerly of U.D.O.) and drummer Hans in 't Zandt, made a new Bangalore Choir album in spring and summer of 2010, called Cadence. The album was released on September 23, 2010, through German label AOR Heaven.

In November 2011, David Reece's Facebook page stated vocals were completed on a new Bangalore Choir album. This new album, Metaphor, was released in April 2012.

Members

Current
 David Reece - lead vocals
 Curt Mitchell - guitars
 Andy Susemihl - guitars
 Danny Greenberg - bass guitar
 Rene Letters - drums

Former
 John Kirk - guitars
 Ian Mayo - bass guitar
 Jackie Ramos - drums
 Hans in 't Zandt

Discography

Studio albums
 On Target (1992)
 Cadence (2010)
 Metaphor (2012)

Live albums
 All or Nothin' - Live at Firefest (2011)

Promotional EPs
 Selections from On Target (1992)

References

Sources
Band biography at SleazeRoxx.com

External links
 Bangalore Choir official website
 David Reece's official website
 Curt Mitchell's official website
 Burning Rain official website
 David Reece Interview

American heavy metal musical groups
Musical groups established in 1991
American hard rock musical groups
1991 establishments in the United States